Rödäng is a residential area in Umeå, Sweden.

External links
Rödäng at Umeå Municipality

Umeå